Zaozerye is a rural locality (a village) in Khokhlovskoye Rural Settlement, Permsky District, Perm Krai, Russia. The population was 62 as of 2010. There are 21 streets.

Geography 
It is located 7 km south-east from Skobelevka.

References 

Rural localities in Permsky District